Bernard Thériault (born November 12, 1955) is a politician in the province of New Brunswick, Canada.  He became chief of staff to Premier of New Brunswick Shawn Graham on October 30, 2006.

Thériault was employed from 1978 to 1987 as curator and historian at the Acadian Historic Village in Caraquet, New Brunswick, his hometown.

He was elected as a Liberal to the Legislative Assembly of New Brunswick in the 1987 election and was re-elected in 1991, 1995 and 1999.  He joined the cabinet in 1994 as Minister of Fisheries and Aquaculture.  In 1997, he became Minister of Intergovernmental and Aboriginal Affairs, a post he held until the defeat of the Liberal government in the 1999 election.  He also served as acting Minister of Education in 1998 while Bernard Richard stepped down from the post to seek the Liberal leadership.

He served briefly in opposition following the 1999 election before resigning in 2000 to run for the Liberal Party of Canada in the 2000 federal election.  He was defeated by incumbent New Democratic Member of Parliament Yvon Godin in the riding of Acadie—Bathurst.

Following his election defeat, he began to work for the federal civil service from 2000 to 2006.  On October 12, 2006 it was announced that he would be leaving his federal post to become chief of staff to the new Liberal premier Shawn Graham effective October 30, 2006.

Sources
 
 News release announcing his appointment as chief of staff

Living people
1955 births
Acadian people
Candidates in the 2000 Canadian federal election
Members of the Executive Council of New Brunswick
New Brunswick Liberal Association MLAs
People from Caraquet
21st-century Canadian politicians
Liberal Party of Canada candidates for the Canadian House of Commons